Westview Junior-Senior High School is a public high school located in Topeka, Indiana that houses students in grades 7–12.

About 
Westview Junior-Senior High School is a small school in Lagrange County in northeastern Indiana. It is situated in a rural farming community, fifty minutes north of Fort Wayne and twenty minutes east of Goshen. The small towns of Topeka and Shipshewana are located within the district. Westview Junior-Senior High School is located in the village of Emma. Westview School Corporation maintains a unique relationship with the Amish Community. Approximately fifty percent of the students in grades K-8 are Amish. Less than one percent of the students in high school are Amish. The main industries in the area are the production of manufactured housing and recreational vehicles, tourism, and farming.

Athletics 
The Westview Warriors compete in the Northeast Corner Conference. The school colors are Scarlet Red & Old Gold. The following Indiana High School Athletic Association (IHSAA) sanctioned sports are offered:

Baseball (boys) 
Basketball (boys and girls) 
Cross Country (boys and girls)
Golf (boys and girls)
Soccer (boys and girls) 
Softball (girls) 
Tennis (boys and girls) 
Track and Field (boys and girls) 
Volleyball (girls) 
Wrestling (boys)

See also 

 List of high schools in Indiana

References

External links
 Official website

Buildings and structures in LaGrange County, Indiana
Public middle schools in Indiana
Public high schools in Indiana